The vice president of El Salvador is a political position in El Salvador which is elected concurrently with the position of President of El Salvador.

A list of the office holders follows. The list may not be complete.

List of vice presidents

See also
List of current vice presidents

References

Government of El Salvador
El Salvador